The Kazakh Ablai Khan University of International Relations and World Languages (KAUIR&WL, Kazakh Ablai Khan University), former Almaty Pedogogical Teacher's Institute of Foreign Languages, has provided foreign language education for 75 years.

History
The history of establishment and development of Kazakh Ablai khan University of International Relations and World Languages is closely related to the development of foreign language teaching in the country. Established in the Soviet period in 1941, after gaining the status of university it began a new page in its history. Training began with 231 students (113 in Faculty of English, 97 in German language, 21 in French language).

There are all conditions for training highly qualified specialists in various branches of humanitarian foreign language and international profile.

Rectors 
 1941 Melikov Hanaahmed Karaevich
 1941 — 1942 Balakaev Maulen Balakayuly
 1942 — 1943 Suleymenov Bekezhan Suleymenovich
 1943 — 1947 Fisenko Varvara Fedorovna
 1947 — 1951 Kuznecov Alexey Ivanovich
 1951 — 1956 Pahmurnyj Pavel Mihajlovich
 1956 — 1962 Iskakov Tulesh Iskakovich
 1962 — 1967 Ibraeva Ajar Khakimovna
 1967 — 1976 Zhandildinov Nurymbet Zhandildinovich
 1977 — 1978 Akhanov Kakhan Akhanovich
 1979 — 1987 Amirov Rakysh Satovich
 1987 — 1992 Irmuhanov Beimbet Babikteevich
 1992 — 1999 Ahmetov Adil Kurmanzhanuly
 1999 — Kunanbaeva Salima Sagikyzy

Faculties and Education Programmes 

 Pedagogical Faculty of Foreign Languages
 Foreign Language: two foreign languages (Pedagogic)
 Pedagogy and psychology
 Faculty of Translation and Philology
 Translation studies (Simultaneous Interpreter; Translator Referent)
 Foreign Philology (English, French, German)
 Faculty of International Relations 
 International Relations
 Regional (Area) Studies
 Faculty of Management and International Communications
 International Tourism Management
 Journalism
 Hotel and Restaurant Management
 Cultural and Communicative Service
 Public Relations
 Faculty of Asian Studies
 Asian Studies
 Translation Studies (Simultaneous Interpreter; Translator Referent)
 Foreign Philology (Chinese, Korean, Arabic, Japanese)
 Faculty of Economics and Law 
 Economics
 Management and Marketing
 State and Local Government
 Jurisprudence
 International Law

International recognition 

 "Austrian Honorary Cross" for contribution to the development of education and culture
 International award "European Quality"
 International award "United Europe" for contribution to European integration
 International honorary award "Socrates" for contribution to the intellectual development of the younger generation
 The honorary title of "Leader of education", was set Cambridge Scientific Association
 International award "Order of Lomonosov" for contribution to science (Russia)
 International Honorary Award "Academic Palm branch" (France)
 Kazakh Ablai Khan University of International Relations and World languages has recently received the International Quality Certificate of the Swiss Institute of Quality Standards “SIQS”
 National Certificate and medal "Industry Leader" in the socio-economic sector
 International award in the field of scientific researches "The name in science"

References 

 
1941 establishments in the Kazakh Soviet Socialist Republic
Educational institutions established in 1941
Universities in Kazakhstan
Universities and institutes established in the Soviet Union